Allsvenskan 1928–29, part of the 1928–29 Swedish football season, was the fifth Allsvenskan season played. The first match was played 5 August 1928 and the last match was played 2 June 1929. Hälsingborgs IF won the league ahead of runners-up Örgryte IS, while IFK Eskilstuna and Westermalms IF were relegated.

Participating clubs

League table

Promotions, relegations and qualifications

Results

Attendances

Top scorers

References 

Print

Online

Notes 

Allsvenskan seasons
1928–29 in Swedish association football leagues
Sweden